Roseville Plantation may refer to:

Roseville Plantation (Florence, South Carolina), listed on the National Register of Historic Places in Florence County, South Carolina
Roseville Plantation (Aylett, Virginia), listed on the National Register of Historic Places in King William County, Virginia